Bulgaria participated in the Eurovision Song Contest 2018 with the song "Bones" written by Borislav Milanov, Joacim Bo Persson, Trey Campbell and Dag Lundberg. The song was performed by the group Equinox. The Bulgarian broadcaster Bulgarian National Television (BNT) organised the internal selection process BG Song 2018 in order to select the Bulgarian entry for the 2018 contest in Lisbon, Portugal. On 12 March 2018, BNT announced that Equinox had been selected to compete with "Bones", which was presented to the public on the same day.

Bulgaria was drawn to compete in the first semi-final of the Eurovision Song Contest which took place on 8 May 2018. Performing during the show in position 19, "Bones" was announced among the top 10 entries of the first semi-final and therefore qualified to compete in the final on 12 May. It was later revealed that Bulgaria placed seventh out of the 19 participating countries in the semi-final with 177 points. In the final, Bulgaria performed in position 18 and placed fourteenth out of the 26 participating countries, scoring 166 points.

Background 

The nation achieved their best result in the contest in 2017 with the song "Beautiful Mess" performed by Kristian Kostov, which placed second. To this point, only three Bulgarian entries had managed to have qualified to the Eurovision final, all of them which placed in the top ten; the nation had failed to qualify to the final with their other eight entries.

The Bulgarian national broadcaster, Bulgarian National Television (BNT), broadcasts the event within Bulgaria and organises the selection process for the nation's entry. BNT confirmed Bulgaria's participation in the 2018 Eurovision Song Contest on 10 October 2017. In the past, BNT had alternated between both internal selections and national finals in order to select the Bulgarian entry. Since 2016, the broadcaster internally selected the Bulgarian entry for the competition, a selection procedure that continued for their 2018 entry.

Before Eurovision

BG Song 2018 
The artist and song that represented Bulgaria at the Eurovision Song Contest 2018 was determined through the internal selection process BG Song 2018. On 14 November 2017, BNT opened a submission period for producers to submit their proposals until 29 December 2017. Each proposal was required to contain both the artist and song as well as the staging concept of the entry. Artists were required to be Bulgarian citizens and have experience of singing live, while eligible producers were those that have experience in artist management, are registered and licensed in PROFON, and have produced at least three projects which have had a high level of popularity in the past two years. Songs were required to contain partial Bulgarian involvement. A new feature of the selection process allowed for independent composers to submit their songs to be considered by interested producers. 

On 30 December 2017, BNT announced that they received a record-breaking 202 songs by the end of the deadline, 13 of them being full projects and evaluated by four focus groups that subsequently shortlisted three entries: music and television industry professionals, members of the media, Bulgarian representatives and a public group of television viewers and Eurovision fans in a proportion representing the viewing structure of the Eurovision Song Contest. On 30 December 2017, the songtitles of the thirteen entries were announced.

 "A New Home"
 "Bad News"
 "Bones"
 "Choosing"
 "Cold as Ice"
 "Collide"
 "Colours"
 "Love Never Lies"
 "Lovers to Enemies"
 "Rebirth"
 "Sky Symphony"
 "Two Hearts Collide"
 "You Will Be the Change"

On 12 March 2018, BNT announced that the group Equinox had been selected to represent Bulgaria in Lisbon. Their song "Bones" was presented through the release of the official lyrics video via the official Eurovision Song Contest's YouTube channel. Equinox was formed specifically for the Eurovision Song Contest and consisted of Bulgarian singers Zhana Bergendorff, Georgi Simeonov and Vlado Mihailov, and American singers Johnny Manuel and Trey Campbell. Bergendorff previously won the second season of X Factor Bulgaria. "Bones" was written by members of the songwriting team Symphonix International: Borislav Milanov, Joacim Bo Persson, Campbell and Dag Lundberg.

Promotion 
Equinox made several appearances across Europe to specifically promote "Bones" as the Bulgarian Eurovision entry. On 14 April, Equinox performed during the Eurovision in Concert event which was held at the AFAS Live venue in Amsterdam, Netherlands and hosted by Edsilia Rombley and Cornald Maas. On 17 April, Equinox performed during the London Eurovision Party, which was held at the Café de Paris venue in London, United Kingdom and hosted by Nicki French and Paddy O'Connell.

At Eurovision 
According to Eurovision rules, all nations with the exceptions of the host country and the "Big Five" (France, Germany, Italy, Spain and the United Kingdom) are required to qualify from one of two semi-finals in order to compete for the final; the top ten countries from each semi-final progress to the final. The European Broadcasting Union (EBU) split up the competing countries into six different pots based on voting patterns from previous contests, with countries with favourable voting histories put into the same pot. On 29 January 2018, a special allocation draw was held which placed each country into one of the two semi-finals, as well as which half of the show they would perform in. Bulgaria was placed into the first semi-final, to be held on 8 May 2018, and was scheduled to perform in the first half of the show.

Once all the competing songs for the 2018 contest had been released, the running order for the semi-finals was decided by the shows' producers rather than through another draw, so that similar songs were not placed next to each other. Bulgaria was set to perform in position 10, following the entry from Estonia and before the entry from Macedonia.

The two semi-finals and the final were broadcast in Bulgaria on BNT 1 with commentary by Elena Rosberg and Georgi Kushvaliev. The Bulgarian spokesperson, who announced the top 12-point score awarded by the Bulgarian jury during the final, was Joanna Dragneva who represented Bulgaria at the 2008 contest as the lead singer of Deep Zone.

Semi-final

Equinox took part in technical rehearsals on 29 April and 3 May, followed by dress rehearsals on 7 and 8 May. This included the jury show on 7 May where the professional juries of each country watched and voted on the competing entries.

The Bulgarian performance featured the members of Equinox in black outfits and performing on elevated glass podiums with smoke behind; Zhana Bergendorff wore a floor length dress with huge shoulder pads. Strobe lighting and a wind machine were used for the performance with overlaying camera shots also being used to create an effect that combined the group members into one. The stage concept and choreography of the Bulgarian performance was developed by Swedish artistic director Sacha Jean-Baptiste. An off-stage backing vocalist also joined Equinox: Maria Georgieva.

At the end of the show, Bulgaria was announced as having finished in the top 10 and subsequently qualifying for the grand final. It was later revealed that Bulgaria placed seventh in the semi-final, receiving a total of 177 points: 70 points from the televoting and 107 points from the juries.

Final 
Shortly after the first semi-final, a winners' press conference was held for the ten qualifying countries. As part of this press conference, the qualifying artists took part in a draw to determine which half of the grand final they would subsequently participate in. This draw was done in the order the countries were announced during the semi-final. Bulgaria was drawn to compete in the second half. Following this draw, the shows' producers decided upon the running order of the final, as they had done for the semi-finals. Bulgaria was subsequently placed to perform in position 18, following the entry from Finland and before the entry from Moldova.

Equinox once again took part in dress rehearsals on 11 and 12 May before the final, including the jury final where the professional juries cast their final votes before the live show. The group performed a repeat of their semi-final performance during the final on 12 May. Bulgaria placed fourteenth in the final, scoring 166 points: 66 points from the televoting and 100 points from the juries.

Voting
Voting during the three shows involved each country awarding two sets of points from 1-8, 10 and 12: one from their professional jury and the other from televoting. Each nation's jury consisted of five music industry professionals who are citizens of the country they represent, with their names published before the contest to ensure transparency. This jury judged each entry based on: vocal capacity; the stage performance; the song's composition and originality; and the overall impression by the act. In addition, no member of a national jury was permitted to be related in any way to any of the competing acts in such a way that they cannot vote impartially and independently. The individual rankings of each jury member as well as the nation's televoting results were released shortly after the grand final.

Below is a breakdown of points awarded to Bulgaria and awarded by Bulgaria in the first semi-final and grand final of the contest, and the breakdown of the jury voting and televoting conducted during the two shows:

Points awarded to Bulgaria

Points awarded by Bulgaria

Detailed voting results
The following members comprised the Bulgarian jury:
 Maya Raykova (jury chairperson)music producer
 Aleksey Vasilevmusic editor, music programming expert
  (Mary)singer, songwriter
 Lora Kozevaradio host
 musician, producer, composer, singer

References

External links 

2018
Countries in the Eurovision Song Contest 2018
Eurovision